Krasna Polyana is a district in the western parts of Sofia. , it has 66,543 inhabitants. It is one of 24 Sofia districts, is 3 km from central Sofia and includes six neighbourhoods: "Ilinden"; "Zapaden Park"; "Razsadnika"; "Krasna Polyana" 1, 2, 3. There are many green areas especially in the neighbourhood of "Zapaden Park" as the name suggests.

References
3. Official site of Krasna Polyana District

Districts of Sofia